Bystry was a  of the Soviet and later Russian navy.

Development and design 

Project began in the late 1960s when it was becoming obvious in the Soviet Navy that naval guns still had an important role particularly in support of amphibious landings, but existing gun cruisers and destroyers were showing their age. A new design was started, employing a new 130 mm automatic gun turret.

Construction and career 
Bystry was laid down on 29 October 1985 and launched on 28 November 1987 by Zhdanov Shipyard in Leningrad. She was commissioned on 30 September 1989.

On September 24, 2010, a fire broke out in the destroyer's engine room. The sailor Aldar Tsydenzhapov was able to extinguish the fire and saved the ship from a potentially disastrous explosion. Four days later, he died in hospital from his burns, and was posthumously awarded the title Hero of the Russian Federation for his actions.

From June 3 to 28, 2013, a detachment of ships – Bystry, Oslyabya and Kalar – left Vladivostok and participated in the military-historical naval Campaign of Memory dedicated to the victory in the Great Patriotic War, the 282nd anniversary of the Pacific Fleet, and the 200th anniversary of the birth of Admiral G. I. Nevelskoy. The route of the campaign was Vladivostok - Nevelsk - Yuzhno-Kurilsk - Severo-Kurilsk - Vilyuchinsk - Okhotsk - Korsakov - Yuzhno-Sakhalinsk - Vladivostok. The ships covered 4,200 miles in 25 days. 

As of the beginning of 2015, since its construction, the ship has covered 43,792 nautical miles, 13 people from the ship's crews have been awarded government awards. 

On January 27, 2016, the destroyer arrived at its home port, Vladivostok. According to the results of 2016, the destroyer crew became the best among the missile and artillery ships of rank 1-2 of the Russian Navy in the competition for the prize of the Commander-in-Chief of the Russian Navy. 

The ship was reported to have decommissioned as of January 2022.

References 

1987 ships
Ships built at Severnaya Verf
Cold War destroyers of the Soviet Union
Sovremenny-class destroyers